Toni Santos Varela Monteiro (born 13 June 1986) is a former Cape Verdean footballer

Club career

RKC Waalwijk
Varela made his first team debut for RKC Waalwijk in the Eerste Divisie as a 46th minute substitute in a 2–2 draw against ADO Den Haag on 24 August 2007.

On 26 February 2009, Varela's was extended until 30 June 2011, because of his progression in the first team.

Sparta Rotterdam
In July 2011, Toni Varela joined Sparta Rotterdam on a free transfer. He was released in the summer of 2013, having played 49 matches for the team in which he scored once.

FC Dordrecht
In November 2013, Varela signed a deal with Eerste Divisie side FC Dordrecht until the end of the season. However, he left the team in January 2014.

Levadiakos
In January 2014, Varela signed with Greek side Levadiakos.

Excelsior
On 5 September 2014, Varela signed a one-year deal with Eredivisie side Excelsior.

International career
Varela is a Cape Verdean international. He made his debut for Cape Verde in an exhibition match against Portugal on 24 May 2010. Varela came on as a 73d minute substitute for Lito.

In 2013 he played in all matches at 2013 Africa Cup of Nations where his team advanced to the quarterfinals, the best result in the history of the national team.

Honours

Club
RKC Waalwijk:
Eerste Divisie: 2010–11

References

External links
 Toni Varela profile on VI.nl

1986 births
Living people
Cape Verdean footballers
Cape Verde international footballers
Dutch footballers
Dutch people of Cape Verdean descent
Association football midfielders
RKC Waalwijk players
Sparta Rotterdam players
FC Dordrecht players
Levadiakos F.C. players
Excelsior Rotterdam players
Al Jahra SC players
SV Horn players
Chabab Rif Al Hoceima players
Eredivisie players
Eerste Divisie players
Super League Greece players
2. Liga (Austria) players
Botola players
2013 Africa Cup of Nations players
People from Santa Catarina, Cape Verde
2015 Africa Cup of Nations players
Cape Verdean expatriate footballers
Expatriate footballers in the Netherlands
Expatriate footballers in Greece
Expatriate footballers in Austria
Expatriate footballers in Kuwait
Expatriate footballers in Morocco
Cape Verdean expatriate sportspeople in the Netherlands
Cape Verdean expatriate sportspeople in Greece
Cape Verdean expatriate sportspeople in Austria
Cape Verdean expatriate sportspeople in Kuwait
Cape Verdean expatriate sportspeople in Morocco
Kuwait Premier League players